Victoria Lagerström (born October 22, 1972) is a Swedish singer and former Miss Universe contestant. She was Miss Sweden in 1997.

Today, Victoria works in the People's Health Department in Stockholm. Victoria has recently finished recording her first CD. The album, titled Heaven Sent, was released in 2007.

See also
Miss Sweden

References

1972 births
Living people
Miss Sweden winners
Miss Universe 1997 contestants
21st-century Swedish singers
21st-century Swedish women singers